, in English the 13th Twin Legion was a legion of the Imperial Roman army. It was one of Julius Caesar's key units in Gaul and in the civil war, and was the legion with which he crossed the Rubicon in January, perhaps the 10th, 49 BC. The legion appears to have still been in existence in the 5th century AD. Its symbol was the lion.

History

Under the late Republic 
Legio XIII was levied by Julius Caesar in 57 BC, before marching against the Belgae, in one of his early interventions in intra-Gallic conflicts. During the Gallic Wars (58–51 BC), Legio XIII was present at the Battle against the Nervians, the Siege of Gergovia, and while not specifically mentioned in the sources, it is reasonable to assume that Legio XIII was also present for the Battle of Alesia.

After the end of the Gallic wars, the Roman Senate refused Caesar his second consulship, ordered  him to give up his commands, and demanded he return to Rome to face prosecution. Forced to choose either the end of his political career or civil war, Caesar brought Legio XIII across the Rubicon river and into Italy. The legion remained faithful to Caesar during the resulting civil war between Caesar and the conservative Optimates faction of the senate, whose legions were commanded by Pompey. Legio XIII was active throughout the entire war, fighting at Dyrrhachium (48 BC) and Pharsalus (48 BC). After the decisive victory over Pompey at Pharsalus, the legion was to be disbanded, and the legionaries "pensioned off" with the traditional land grants; however, the legion was recalled for the Battle of Thapsus (46 BC) and the final Battle of Munda (45 BC).  After Munda, Caesar disbanded the legion, retired his veterans, and gave them farmland in their native Italy.

Under the Empire 
Augustus reconstituted the legion once again in 41 BC to deal with the rebellion of Sextus Pompeius (son of Pompey) in Sicily.

Legio XIII acquired the cognomen Gemina ("twin", a common appellation for legions constituted from portions of others) after being reinforced with veteran legionaries from other legions following the war against Mark Antony and the Battle of Actium. Augustus then sent the legion to Burnum (modern Knin), in Illyricum, a Roman province in the Adriatic Sea.

In 16 BC, the legion was transferred to Emona (now Ljubljana) in Pannonia, where it dealt with local rebellions.

After the disaster of the Battle of the Teutoburg Forest in AD 9, the legion was sent as reinforcements to Augusta Vindelicorum (Augsburg), and then to Vindonissa, Raetia, to prevent further attacks from the Germanic tribes.

Emperor Claudius sent them back to Pannonia around 45 and the legion built its legionary fortress at Poetovium (modern Ptuj, Slovenia).

In the year of the four emperors (69), XIII Gemina supported first Otho and then Vespasian against Vitellius, fighting in the two Battles of Bedriacum.

Under Trajan the legion took part in both Dacian wars (101–102, 105–106), and it was transferred by Trajan in 106 to the newly conquered province of Dacia (in Apulum, modern Alba Iulia, Romania) to garrison it.

Vexillationes of the XIII Gemina fought under Emperor Gallienus in northern Italy. The emperor issued a legionary antoninianus celebrating the legion, and showing the legion's lion (259–260). Another vexillatio was present in the army of the emperor of the Gallic Empire Victorinus: this emperor, in fact, issued a gold coin celebrating the legion and its emblem.

In 271, the legion was relocated when the Dacia province was evacuated, and restationed in Dacia Aureliana.

In the 5th century, according to the Notitia Dignitatum, a legio tertiadecima gemina was in Babylon in Egypt, a strategic fortress on the Nile at the traditional border between Lower Egypt and Middle Egypt, under the command of the Comes limitis Aegypti.

Attested members

Epigraphic inscriptions 

- Marco Cornelio Marci filio Galeria (tribu) Nigrino / Curiatio Materno consuli - / - tribuno militum legionis XIIII Geminae (...). Liria, Spain.  CIL II2/14.
- Caio Iulio Galeria (tribu) Lepido Iessonensi primi pilari centurioni legionis XIII Geminae Piae Fidelis centurioni (...). Lerida (Ilerda), Spain. CIL II 4463.

Fictional depictions 
 A fictionalized account of the actions of Legio XIII Gemina during the struggle between Julius Caesar and the Optimates faction under Pompey can be seen in the joint HBO/BBC/RAI television production Rome, most notably two of its soldiers: Centurion Lucius Vorenus and Legionary Titus Pullo, named after real-life Centurions Lucius Vorenus and Titus Pullo of the Legio XI Claudia. The show includes a fictional incident where the legion's eagle standard is stolen by the Gaulish brigands.

See also 
 Roman legion
 List of Roman legions
 Dacia Ripensis

Notes

References

Primary sources

Secondary sources

External links 

LEGIO XIII GEMINA, Italian re-enactment group (in Ariminum and Bononia)
LEG XIII GEM, Austrian re-enactment group
LEGIO XIII GEMINA Blog (Roman reenactment group inside the virtual world of Second Life)
 Legio XIIII Gemina Martia Victrix (Roman Military Research Society)

13 Gemina
50s BC establishments
57 BC
13 Gemina
Military units and formations established in the 1st century BC